The Order of Honor Star is one of Egypt's highest military decorations. It is awarded to the officers, non-commissioned officers, soldiers of the Egyptian Armed Forces for performing acts of extraordinary gallantry and intrepidity in direct combat with the enemy.

Privileges and courtesies
The Order confers special privileges on its recipients. The recipients have several benefits:
 A monthly reward of twenty thousand Egyptian pounds, the recipients retains the monthly reward for the duration of his service and if he is transferred to a civilian job and also when he is referred to the pension.
 The education of his children is free of charge in various stages of education in all state-owned schools, colleges and institutions and are exempted from admission requirements with respect to age and total scores.

Most prominent star recipients
Ahmad Ismail Ali
Abdul Munim Riad
Saad el-Shazly
Mohamed Abdel Ghani el-Gamasy
Ahmed Badawi
Abd al-Halim Abu Ghazala
Hosni Mubarak

References

Orders, decorations, and medals of Egypt
Awards established in 1957
1957 establishments in Egypt